The Transit Enforcement Unit (TEU; formerly known as the Special Constable Services Department) is the transit law enforcement and corporate security unit of the Toronto Transit Commission (TTC) in Toronto, Ontario, Canada. As of May 2019, the TEU employs 80 transit enforcement officers (TEOs), and 100 transit fare inspectors (TFIs).

History

Starting in July 1987, the TTC employed staff designated as provincial offences officers, responsible for the enforcement of TTC by-laws, responding to calls for service, and protecting TTC employees, customers, and assets. Prior to the creation of the Transit Enforcement Unit, policing on the TTC was limited to patrols by TTC by-law officers and periodic patrols by the Metropolitan Toronto Police.

The Transit Enforcement Unit was created in June 1997, after the Toronto Police Services Board, with the approval of the Solicitor General, designated the employees responsible for safety and security as special constables under Section 53 of the Police Services Act. The designation was governed by a contractual relationship between the TTC and the Toronto Police Services Board.

In the late 2000s, Toronto City Council, which governs but is separate from the Police Services Board, approved a plan to dramatically expand the unit by several hundred special constables with expanded police authority. During subsequent implementation discussions with the Police Services Board, several incidents came to light where individual TTC special constables had overstepped their authority and exercised police powers outside of TTC property, and the Board ultimately terminated the TTC's special constabulary. In 2013, the Police Services Board approved then-CEO Andy Byford's plan to restore the agency's special constabulary with slightly fewer powers and an independent complaints process.

In 2014, a former Phoenix Police Department commander, Mark Cousins, was appointed chief special constable of the Transit Enforcement Unit.

In 2015, fare enforcement officers were equipped with stab vests and updated uniforms but gave up their batons and handcuffs as part of an effort to make the inspectors more customer friendly. The next year, the TTC board approved a unit proposal for plainclothes fare enforcement officers in addition to uniformed officers and special constables.

TTC special constables were among the first responders to the 2018 Toronto van attack, working alongside police and members of the public to secure the scene and provide first aid to victims.

On February 7, 2020, two special constables and a fare inspector grabbed a 34-year old after he refused to provide proof-of-payment while riding a streetcar, provoking a brief fight that resulted in the transit user pleading guilty to two counts of assaulting a peace officer and the two special constables being fired for using "unnecessary" and "unauthorized" force. In the wake of the incident, the City of Toronto ombudsman called for the TTC to reform the unit's "paramilitary" culture.

In 2021, three members of the unit were placed on administrative leave after the TTC ordered an external investigation into allegations of favouritism, harassment, and improper use of the overtime system based on complaints made to the TTC's whistleblower hotline.

Operations 
The Transit Enforcement Unit has four sections:

 Patrol (special constables)
 Fare Inspection (fare inspectors)
 System Security (special constables and protective services guards / supervisors)
 Training and Logistical Support (special constables and fare inspectors)

Jurisdiction

Transit enforcement officers 
Transit enforcement officers (TEOs) are sworn as special constables by the Toronto Police Services Board under the Police Services Act, granting them limited police powers. They have the same powers as a police officer to enforce the Criminal Code, the Controlled Drugs and Substances Act, the Liquor Licence Act, and the Trespass to Property Act. 

Specifically, TEOs:

 have powers and obligations of a peace officer under ss. 495 to 497 of the Criminal Code and subsections 495(3) and 497(3) of that Act, apply to the special constable as if he/she is a peace officer,
 have powers of a police officer for the purposes of ss. 16, and 17 of the Mental Health Act, R.S.O. 1990, c. M.7, as amended,
 have powers of a police officer for the purposes of ss.31(5), 36(1), 47(1) and (1.1), and 48 of the Liquor Licence Act, R.S.O. 1990, c. L.19, as amended,
 have powers of a police officer for the purposes of ss. 9 of the Trespass to Property Act, R.S.O. 1990, c. T.21, as amended, and
 are designated as provincial offences officers for the purposes of enforcement of the Liquor License Act, Trespass to Property Act and TTC By-law No. 1.

TEOs are also designated as agents/occupiers of the TTC.

Transit fare inspectors 
TFIs are designated as provincial offences officers for the purpose of enforcing TTC By-law No. 1, and the Trespass to Property Act.

Deployment
The Mobile Patrol Division members were the visible presence on TTC surface vehicles while the Subway Patrol Division members were the visible presence in the subway system. They wore uniforms distinct from the standard TTC or Toronto Police uniforms; consisting of a black jacket and powder blue shirt with a special constables crest on both shoulders and black cargo pants. They were armed with batons and OC foam (pepper spray in a less aerosol form to avoid contamination in confined places), body armour and carried portable radios. Some officers patrolled the subway system on foot, while others drove in marked or unmarked vehicles, responding to calls on surface routes and in the subway.

Policing issues
According to the 2008 Annual Report to the Transit Commission, the special constables were involved in 1215 arrests, and laid approximately 450 charges during the calendar year ending December 31, 2008. During that period, over 6000 occurrence reports were filed regarding incidents that did not involve arrests or charges.

Transit fare inspectors and proof-of-payment
The Transit Enforcement Unit employs approximately 63 transit fare inspectors, who conduct fare inspections and enforce fares on designated proof-of-payment routes (either on board the vehicles, or at terminal/interchange stations). The inspectors are dressed in white uniforms, with a "Fare Inspector" banner on the back.

This unit was launched in August 2014, when the new Flexity low-floor streetcars entered service on street car lines. All streetcar lines use an honour system where passengers pay their fare using electronic fare machines or by using the Presto fare system. Transit fare inspectors will then inspect passengers while on a vehicle, exiting a vehicle, or at subway stations.

Fleet
 Ford Taurus Police Interceptor with new graphics package
 Ford Police Interceptor – Previously marked, however all have been converted to unmarked operation
 Various unmarked vehicles for undercover and surveillance operations

Ranks

 Special constable (Patrol)
 Sergeant (Patrol / Fare Inspection / Training and Logistical Support)
 Staff sergeant (Patrol / System Security / Fare Inspection / Training and Logistical Support)
 Chief special constable

Other positions

 Fare inspector (provincial offences officer)
 Protective services guard (Security / Revenue Protection)

See also
YRT Special Constable Services

External links
Transit Enforcement Unit

References

Toronto Transit Commission
Law enforcement agencies of Ontario